Al Aziziyah may refer to:

Al-Aziziyah, district of Al-Hasakah, Syria
Al-Aziziyah (Iraq), town in Iraq
‘Aziziya, city in Libya